Bulgan is a sum (district) of Bayan-Ölgii Province in western Mongolia. As of 2014 it had a population of 5216 people.

References

Populated places in Mongolia
Districts of Bayan-Ölgii Province